The 1921 Southwest Texas State Bobcats football team was an American football team that represented Southwest Texas State Normal School—now known as Texas State University–as an independent during the 1921 college football season. Led by third-year head coach Oscar W. Strahan, the team finished the season with a record of 7–0, posting the program's first undefeated season. The Texas Normal championship also earned entry into the Texas Intercollegiate Athletic Association (TIAA). Pete Shand's was the team's captain.

Schedule

References

Southwest Texas State
Texas State Bobcats football seasons
Southwest Texas State Bobcats football